= Pseudobixatoides =

Scientific classification
- Kingdom: Animalia
- Phylum: Arthropoda
- Class: Insecta
- Order: Coleoptera
- Suborder: Polyphaga
- Infraorder: Cucujiformia
- Family: Cerambycidae
- Genus: Pseudobixatoides
- Species: P. nonveilleri

Binomial name
- Pseudobixatoides nonveilleri (Breuning, 1975)

Species of beetle

Pseudobixatoides nonveilleri is a species of beetle in the family Cerambycidae, and the only species in the genus Pseudobixatoides. It was described by Stephan von Breuning in 1975.
